Luper, Oregon is a ghost town in Lane County, Oregon, United States. The community was named for James N. Luper, a pioneer born in 1852 in Illinois. The Luper Cemetery remains in the area. In 1970, the Oregon Genealogical Society counted 118 grave sites.

James Luper's daughter, Oregon State Engineer Rhea Luper, recalled in 1927 that her father had purchased the Luper-area property around 1870, and thereafter constructed a warehouse and railroad spur. The area became a shipping point for wheat.

References 

Former populated places in Lane County, Oregon
Ghost towns in Oregon